HSC Gotlandia II is a fast ferry operated by the Swedish company Destination Gotland. It was built by Fincantieri, Italy in 2006. It is used on Destination Gotland's routes Nynäshamn-Visby and Oskarshamn-Visby. The ferry can carry up to 780 passengers and has a waterjet propulsion system that allows speeds up to 35 knots.

2009 Collision 
On July 23, 2009 Gotlandia II and another Destination Gotland ferry, collided outside Nynäshamn. Gotlandia II received heavy damage to its superstructure and 5 people were rushed to a hospital. It was later announced that the ferry would be out of service for the rest of the season. Two days after the collision Gotlandia II sailed to Norrköping, where it was laid up until a shipyard that can take the ship in for repairs was found.
By January 2011 the ship was back in service.

References

External links 

 HSC Gotlandia II - history (in Swedish)

Ferries of Sweden
2005 ships
Ships built by Fincantieri